Demeter Laccataris (1798 – 24 December 1864) was an Austrian portrait painter of Greek origin.  Born in Vienna, he studied at Debrecen and Vienna.  He was based at Pest from around 1835 and painted portraits and altarpieces.  He painted signboards as well. There is a representative collection exhibited at the Hungarian National Gallery.

He died at Pest.

References
 Laccataris Demeter. In: Austrian Biographical Encyclopaedia 1815-1950 (ÖBL). Volume 4 Austrian Academy of Sciences, Vienna 1969, pp. 392 et seq (direct links on S. 392, S. 393).

External links
Fine Arts in Hungary
Works by Laccataris

1798 births
1864 deaths
Austrian portrait painters
Austrian people of Greek descent
Hungarian painters
19th-century Austrian painters
Austrian male painters
19th-century Austrian male artists